Merguir Bardisbanian was an Armenian sound engineer, born in Smyrna, in the Aidin Vilayet of the Ottoman Empire on 3 November 1897 and became a naturalized French citizen in December 1929.

Filmography
A graduate of the École Centrale Paris, he worked as chief operator for the French cinema:
1932: Live at the heart of Leo and Roger Arnaudy
1934: Jean Renoir's Toni
1935: Angela Marcel Pagnol

References

1897 births
Year of death missing
People from İzmir
People from Aidin vilayet
Smyrniote Armenians
Emigrants from the Ottoman Empire to France
Armenians from the Ottoman Empire
French people of Armenian descent
French audio engineers